Lu Zhuo (born 18 November 1980) is a Chinese speed skater. He competed in two events at the 2006 Winter Olympics.

References

1980 births
Living people
Chinese male speed skaters
Olympic speed skaters of China
Speed skaters at the 2006 Winter Olympics
Place of birth missing (living people)
Speed skaters at the 2003 Asian Winter Games
21st-century Chinese people